Engineer Manuel Moreno Torres National Airport  is a general aviation airport located in Matehuala, San Luis de Potosí, Mexico.

External links
 airport information

Airports in San Luis Potosí